CFSK-DT (channel 4) is a television station in Saskatoon, Saskatchewan, Canada, part of the Global Television Network. Owned and operated by network parent Corus Entertainment, the station has studios on Robin Crescent on the northwest side of Saskatoon (near the Saskatoon John G. Diefenbaker International Airport), and its transmitter is located on Agra and Settlers Ridge Roads (near Highway 41), northeast of the city.

History

The station first signed on the air on September 6, 1987, under the ownership of Canwest. CFSK and its sister station in Regina, CFRE-TV, were initially branded as "STV" (short for "Saskatchewan Television"). It joined the Canwest Global System in 1990. At the time that STV went on the air, it was Saskatoon's third locally based over-the-air television station, joining a market that included CTV's CFQC and the then-operational CBC affiliate, CBKST. However, technically it was Saskatoon's second fully licensed station; CBKST was licensed as a rebroadcaster of Regina's CBKT.

Canwest discontinued the STV branding, along with all other individual local station brandings in 1997, when the Global Television Network brand was expanded to all of Canwest's stations. One of STV's major broadcasts in its early years was the children's program Size Small Island (that show was originally broadcast on sister station CKND-TV in Winnipeg), which was syndicated around the world (the show's host, Helen Lumby, officially launched the mini-network's first broadcast in Saskatoon in 1987). Since the closure of CBKST in 2012, CFSK is one of only two over-the-air broadcast stations originating from Saskatoon.

News operation

CFSK-DT presently broadcasts 24½ hours of locally produced newscasts each week (with 4½ hours each weekday and one hour each on Saturdays and Sundays); it is among the few Global stations (and one of the few television stations in Canada) to carry a prime time newscast during the 10 p.m. hour.

On December 5, 2011, CFSK-DT debuted a three-hour newscast on weekday mornings (under Global's Morning News brand), which runs from 6 to 9 a.m. Around the same time, CFSK became the first television station in Saskatoon to begin broadcasting its local newscasts in high definition.

On August 20, 2012, CFSK expanded its half-hour 10 p.m. newscast to one hour, which was retitled from Prime News to News Hour Final; the addition of the morning newscast and the expansion of the prime time newscast is part of an expansion of local news programming on Global owned-and-operated stations across Canada as part of a benefits package that was included as a condition of the sale of the Global Television Network to Shaw Communications.

As of February 2018, Global Saskatoon's only locally produced newscast is Global News Morning from 6–9 a.m. Global News at 6, previously anchored by local anchor Julie Mintenko, is now anchored by Global Regina's evening anchor Carlyle Fiset. Weather reports for both Global Regina and Saskatoon are produced by Saskatoon local Peter Quinlan, however. Global News at 10 was anchored by Global Toronto anchors Crystal Goomansingh and Antony Robart from September 2015 until 2018, however it has now returned to Saskatchewan, albeit anchored by Global Regina anchors Carlyle Fiset and Elise Darwish.

Notable former on-air staff
 Darren Dutchyshen – sports (anchor of the prime time edition of SportsCentre on TSN)
 Jay Onrait – sports (later and now back with TSN; was with Fox Sports 1 in August 2013 – March 2017)

Technical information

Subchannels

Analogue-to-digital conversion
On August 15, 2011, 2½ weeks before Canadian television stations in CRTC-designated mandatory markets were slated to transition from analogue to digital broadcasts, CFSK flash cut its digital signal into operation on UHF channel 42. Through the use of PSIP, television receivers will list CFSK-DT's virtual channel number as 4.1.

References

External links
Global Saskatoon

FSK-DT
FSK-DT
Television channels and stations established in 1987
Corus Entertainment
1987 establishments in Saskatchewan